Terrot Reaveley Glover (1869–1943) was a Cambridge University lecturer of classical literature. He was a fellow of St John's College, Cambridge. He was also a Latinist, and is known for translating Robert Louis Stevenson's A Child's Garden of Verses to Latin.

Life
Glover was born in Bristol where his father, the Rev. Richard Glover, was minister of Tyndale Baptist Church.

Glover worked as a lecturer for nearly 20 years. 

He was a representative of Cambridge University at University College Bristol until he resigned. Hansard, records that his resignation and the opinions of Geraldine Hodgson and Professor Gerothwohl concerning "grave reflections upon the administration of the university" were raised in Parliament as a pretext for a Public Enquiry on 1 May 1913. The enquiry was not authorised.

Glover also wrote books, including The Jesus of History and Poets and Puritans. He was Public Orator of Cambridge University between 1920 and 1939, until he was succeeded by W. K. C. Guthrie.

Glover was a Baptist and attended St Andrews Street Baptist Church in Cambridge, where his friend Melbourn Aubrey was minister until 1925. Aubrey recalled that for Glover "the Old Testament came to have less and less value and in his last years he appeared to resent ministers taking texts or even lessons from it." Glover had six children. He conducted services in Appleton chapel at Harvard University on 19 December 1923 while visiting the university.

Selected bibliography

Glover, T. R. (Terrot Reaveley). (1917). The Jesus of history. London: Student Christian Movement; New York: Association Press.
Glover, T. R. (Terrot Reaveley). (1904). Studies in Virgil. London: E. Arnold.
Glover, T. R. (Terrot Reaveley). (1909). The conflict of religions in the early Roman empire. 3d ed. London: Methuen & co.
Glover, T. R. (Terrot Reaveley). (1916). Poets and Puritans. London: Methuen & co. ltd..
Tertullian, c. 160-ca. 230., Glover, T. R. (Terrot Reaveley)., Minucius Felix, M. (1931). Apology: De spectaculis. Cambridge, Mass.: Harvard University Press .
Glover, T. R. (Terrot Reaveley). (1921). The pilgrim: essays on religion. London: Student Christian Movement.
Glover, T. R. (Terrot Reaveley). (1922). The Jesus of history. New York: Association Press.
Glover, T. R. (Terrot Reaveley). (1922). Progress in religion to the Christian era. London: Student Christian movement.
Glover, T. R. (Terrot Reaveley). (1922). The nature and purpose of a Christian society. New York: George H. Doran company.
Glover, T. R. (Terrot Reaveley). (1932). Democracy and religion... Sackville: N. B., Mount Allison university.
Glover, T. R. (Terrot Reaveley). (1917). From Pericles to Philip. New York: The Macmillan Company.
Glover, T. R. (Terrot Reaveley). (1924). Herodotus. Berkeley, Calif.: The University of California press.
Glover, T. R. (Terrot Reaveley). (1935). The ancient world: a beginning. New York: The Macmillan company.
Glover, T. R. (Terrot Reaveley). (1921). Jesus in the experience of men. New York: Association Press.

References

External links

List of Online Books by T. R. Glover

 

1869 births
1943 deaths
Academics of the University of Cambridge
Cambridge University Orators
British tax resisters
Presidents of the Classical Association